Fanahan McSweeney (21 August 1947 – 27 July 1995) was an Irish sprinter. He competed in the men's 400 metres at the 1972 Summer Olympics.

References

1947 births
1995 deaths
Athletes (track and field) at the 1972 Summer Olympics
Irish male sprinters
Olympic athletes of Ireland
Place of birth missing